José Carlos Teixeira Lopes dos Reis Gonçalves (born 31 July 1998), known as Zé Carlos, is a Portuguese professional footballer who plays as a right-back for Gil Vicente F.C. on loan from S.C. Braga.

Club career
Born in Lousada, Porto District, Zé Carlos spent most of his youth career with Leixões S.C. before beginning as a senior in the lower leagues with S.C. Salgueiros and Leça FC. In January 2018 he returned to Leixões on a 2-year deal to cover the injury of Edu Machado. He made his professional debut in LigaPro on 8 February in a 1–0 win against Varzim S.C. at home.

On 30 July 2020, Zé Carlos signed a four-year contract with Primeira Liga club S.C. Braga. He played his first match in the competition on 28 December, coming on as a 50th-minute substitute for Nuno Sequeira in the 4–1 away victory over Boavista FC.

Zé Carlos spent the following two seasons on loan, at Gil Vicente F.C. (twice) and UD Ibiza (Spanish Segunda División). In his first spell at the former, he was a key member of a Ricardo Soares-led side that qualified for the UEFA Europa Conference League – first ever in their history – after a fifth-place finish.

References

External links

1998 births
Living people
People from Lousada
Sportspeople from Porto District
Portuguese footballers
Association football defenders
Primeira Liga players
Liga Portugal 2 players
Campeonato de Portugal (league) players
S.C. Salgueiros players
Leça F.C. players
Leixões S.C. players
S.C. Braga players
Gil Vicente F.C. players
Segunda División players
UD Ibiza players
Portuguese expatriate footballers
Expatriate footballers in Spain
Portuguese expatriate sportspeople in Spain